Paul Luebke (January 18, 1946 – October 29, 2016) was a Democratic member of the North Carolina General Assembly, representing the 30th House District, which includes constituents in Durham County.  A professor of Sociology at the University of North Carolina at Greensboro, Luebke served eleven consecutive two-year term in the state House of Representatives.

Childhood and education
Paul Luebke was born on January 18, 1946, in Chicago, Illinois, to Paul and Eunice Luebke. His father was a teacher and education administrator and his mother was a homemaker.  Luebke spent his childhood living in Chicago, Detroit and St. Louis. During his high school years he moved to Ankara, Turkey, where his father worked as an education advisor to the Turkish government for the U.S. Foreign Aid Program.

While living in Turkey he studied at Privatschule der deutschen Botschaft, a German embassy school in Ankara, from 1959 until 1962.

After high school, Luebke attended Robert College in Istanbul, Turkey. In 1966 he earned a bachelor of arts in government from Valparaiso University in Indiana. He earned a doctorate in political sociology from Columbia University in 1975.

After graduate school he moved to the Durham area.

Career
Paul Luebke taught sociology at Tougaloo College, a historically black college in Jackson, Mississippi from 1971 to 1975.  He taught sociology at University of North Carolina at Chapel Hill from 1975 to 1976. Luebke began teaching sociology at UNC Greensboro in 1976 and was awarded tenure in 1982.

He was a member of the sociology faculty at the University of North Carolina at Greensboro, specializing in political sociology.

He served on the Raleigh-Durham Airport Authority from 1987 until 1991. He served as a board member of the North Carolina Consumers Council as a consumer rights advocate.

He was elected to the state House of Representatives in Durham's District 23, which then had three members, in 1990 and took up his position in 1991.

As of February 2011 Luebke represented District 30 and was a member of the following committees:

Agriculture
Education
Finance
Government
Public utilities
Rules, calendar and operations of the House

He was a chairman of the Finance committee and of the select committee on Municipal Annexation, as well as vice-chairman of the Election Law, Campaign Finance Reform and Rules, Calendar, and Operations of the House committees. He was also a member of the Energy and Energy Efficiency committee and the Environmental and Natural Resources committee.

He thought of himself as a "Progressive Democrat" and said that "I am especially proud that, during the 1990s, I led the bipartisan effort to eliminate the state sales tax on groceries; and that, in 2009, I was a primary House sponsor of the Racial Justice Act." Luebke died of lymphoma on October 29, 2016 at the age of 70, while still in office.

Books
Luebke wrote of two books about North Carolina politics: Tar Heel Politics: Myths and Realities (1990) and Tar Heel Politics 2000 (1998).

Electoral history

2016

2014

2012

2010

2008

2006

2004

2002

2000

Committee assignments

2015-2016 session
Finance (Vice Chair)
Environment
Local Government
Public Utilities

2013-2014 session
Finance (Vice Chair)
Agriculture
Education
Environment
Government
Public Utilities

2011-2012 session
Finance
Rules, Calendar, and Operations of the House
Agriculture
Education
Government
Public Utilities

2009-2010 session
Election Law and Campaign Finance Reform
Energy and Energy Efficiency 
Environment and Natural Resources
Finance
Rules, Calendar, and Operations of the House

References

External links
 NC General Assembly, "North Carolina General Assembly - Representative Paul Luebke". ncleg.net. Retrieved on 2011-02-10

|-

1946 births
2016 deaths
Democratic Party members of the North Carolina House of Representatives
Columbia Graduate School of Arts and Sciences
Valparaiso University alumni
Politicians from Chicago
Writers from Chicago
Writers from North Carolina
21st-century American politicians